Leona Creek is a stream in Victoria County, Texas, in the United States.

Leona is a name derived from Spanish meaning "lioness".

See also
List of rivers of Texas

References

Rivers of Victoria County, Texas
Rivers of Texas